The  (abbreviation: BAB 995 ) – short form: Autobahn 995 (abbreviation: A 995 ) is an autobahn near Munich in southern Germany. It connects the southwestern parts of Munich with the A 8 (Munich – Salzburg ) and A 99. It is around eleven kilometers long and has two lanes and hard a shoulder in each direction.

History 
The entire section of road was completed in 1972 for the Olympic Games as the "Unterhaching – Taufkirchen bypass".

Status 
Despite the continuous blue signage and full motorway provisions, originally only the short stretch between the Munich-South junction and Sauerlach was actually dedicated as a federal motorway. The route between the Sauerlach junction and the southern border of Munich (at the Munich-Giesing junction) was designated as "Bundesstraße 13 (new)". The "Autobahndirektion Südbayern" was responsible for this section according to Section 3 (2) (a) of the Ordinance on the Transfer of Powers under the German Federal Trunk Roads Act. Therefore, no motorway or federal road number was given for the entire route, only the European route E54.

On January 1, 2018, the entire route was finally upgraded to Bundesautobahn 995 (BAB 995), which also required the installation of new signs showing the Autobahn number.

As of October 1, 2019, the responsibilities for the A 995 are with the Hohenbrunn motorway maintenance department.

Junctions 

 

 

 
|-
|colspan="3"|

|-

|-
|
|
|¹ officially known as B 13 
|}

References

External links 

995
A995
A995